Lower Marsh is a street in the Waterloo neighbourhood of London, England. It is adjacent to Waterloo railway station in the London Borough of Lambeth. It is the location of Lower Marsh Market.

History
Until the early 19th century much of north Lambeth (now known as the South Bank) was mostly marsh.  The settlement of Lambeth Marsh was built on a raised through road over the marsh lands, potentially dating back to Roman times. The land on which it stands was owned by the church of England, with Lambeth Palace nearby.  Records and maps show that it was a separate village until the early 19th Century when the church sold off the land in small pockets, thereby leading to random development of individual houses rather than the grander redevelopments occurring north of the river. Lower Marsh and The Cut formed the commercial heart of the area from the early 19th century.

The northern tip of the ancient parish of Lambeth was a marshland known as Lambeth Marshe, but it was drained in the 18th century and is remembered in the Lower Marsh street name. Sometime after the opening of Waterloo railway station in 1848 the locality around the station and Lower Marsh became known as Waterloo.

Previously regarded as a comparatively underdeveloped location, Lower Marsh has more recently undergone gentrification, supported by private enterprise and injections of capital from Lambeth and Southwark councils.

, Lower Marsh street is a vibrant road, home of Lower Marsh Market and a variety of vintage shops, pubs, bookshops, art galleries, independent coffee spaces and a variety of restaurants featuring food from many ethnic origins. The market has 77 stalls.

References

External links
Lower Marsh information

History of the London Borough of Lambeth
Streets in the London Borough of Lambeth
Retail markets in London
Buildings and structures in the London Borough of Lambeth
Tourist attractions in the London Borough of Lambeth